Jawhar is a city and municipal council in India.

Jawhar may also refer to:

People
 Jawhar (general) (died 992), Fatimid general of the Byzantine Empire
 Jawhar bin Haydar bin ʽAli (c. 1837–1937), Ethiopian mystic and Islamic scholar
 Jawhar Mnari (born 1976), Tunisian former footballer
 Jawhar Namiq (1946–2011), first president of the Kurdistan National Assembly
 Jawhar Purdy (born 1991), Filipino-American basketball player
 Jawhar Sircar (born 1952), Indian politician and former government official
 Hassan Jawhar (born 1960), Kuwaiti politician
 Mansour Jawhar (born 1995), Saudi Arabian football goalkeeper
 Sabria Jawhar, Saudi Arabian journalist and columnist for the Arab News
 Athanasius IV Jawhar (1733–1794), Patriarch of the Melkite Greek Catholic Church

Other uses
 Jawhar State, a former princely state in India

See also
 Jowhar, a city in Somalia
 Johar, an American race horse
 Gohar, a given name and a surname
 Gohar, Iran, a village
 Gohar, Pakistan, a village